Norman Public Schools (formally known as Independent School District Number 29 of Cleveland County, Oklahoma) is a public school district serving parts of Norman, Oklahoma, United States. There are over 15,000 students enrolled in the district. The district consists of 17 elementary schools, four middle schools, and three high schools.

High schools
There are three high schools in the Norman Public Schools district:
Norman High School
Norman North High School
Dimensions High School

Middle schools
The middle schools in the district are named for famous American writers.  The middle schools are as follows:
Alcott Middle School
Irving Middle School
Longfellow Middle School
Whittier Middle School

Elementary schools
Sixteen of the elementary schools in the district are named for presidents of the United States, while one school's name was inspired by its close proximity to Lakeview. The elementary schools are:
Adams Elementary School
Cleveland Elementary School
Eisenhower Elementary School
Jackson Elementary School
Jefferson Elementary School
Kennedy Elementary School
Lakeview Elementary School
Lincoln Elementary School
Madison Elementary School
McKinley Elementary School
Monroe Elementary School
Reagan Elementary School
Roosevelt Elementary School
Truman Elementary School (grades 3–5)
Truman Primary Elementary School (preK-2nd grade)
Washington Elementary School
Wilson Elementary School

References

External links
Norman Public Schools

School districts in Oklahoma
Norman, Oklahoma
Education in Cleveland County, Oklahoma